Alphonso "Al" Williams (born October 5, 1961) is a former American football wide receiver who played college football for the Nevada Wolf Pack, then played at a professional level in the USFL, NFL, and CFL.

Professional career
Williams was selected by the New Jersey Generals in the 18th round (364th overall) of the 1984 USFL Draft and the Detroit Lions in the 1st round (20th overall) of the 1984 NFL Supplemental Draft.

He ended up playing for the Oklahoma/Arizona Outlaws, while the Detroit Lions kept him on the practice squad. After the USFL folded and the Detroit Lions released him in 1986, Williams became a free agent. In 1987, Williams was picked up by the San Diego Chargers and New Orleans Saints during preseason, then played in three games for the San Diego Chargers during the NFLPA strike. He was traded to the Tampa Bay Buccaneers for a conditional draft pick, then last played in the CFL for the Hamilton Tiger-Cats.

Personal life
Williams had settled in Arizona. He revealed in a podcast with former teammate Billy Ray Smith Jr. that he was coaching and been involved with multiple charities for the local youth.

References

1961 births
Living people
American football wide receivers
Canadian football wide receivers
San Diego Chargers players
Oklahoma Outlaws players
Arizona Outlaws players
Hamilton Tiger-Cats players
Nevada Wolf Pack football players